Indium(III) fluoride or indium trifluoride is the inorganic compound with the formula InF3. It is a white solid.

It has a rhombohedral crystal structure very similar to that of rhodium(III) fluoride.  Each In center is octahedral. It is formed by the reaction of indium(III) oxide with hydrogen fluoride or hydrofluoric acid.

Indium(III) fluoride is used in the synthesis of non-oxide glasses. It catalyzes the addition of trimethylsilyl cyanide (TMSCN) to aldehydes to form cyanohydrins.

References

Indium compounds
Fluorides
Metal halides